Bisali Union is an Union parishad of Narail Sadar Upazila, Narail District in Khulna Division of Bangladesh. It has an area of 0.46 km2 (11.76 sq mi) and a population of 9,201.

References

Unions of Narail Sadar Upazila
Unions of Narail District
Unions of Khulna Division